8D or 8-D may refer to:

8D, standard size code for electric batteries
8D Technologies, a Canadian company that develops bicycle-sharing systems.
Astair IATA code
Eight disciplines problem solving (8Ds) is used to identify, correct, and eliminate the recurrence of quality problems.
Eight-dimensional space
Expo Aviation IATA code
GCR Class 8D, a class of British 4-4-2 steam locomotive
Secondary State Highway 8D (Washington), used 1937–1964; became WA 121 in 1964–1967, renumbered WA 141 in 1968
Servant Air IATA code
An internet emoticon in which the '8' represents open eyes and the 'D' an open mouth, see List of emoticons
Audi A4 B5 (Type 8D)

See also
D8 (disambiguation)